Bythinella pupoides is a species of very small freshwater snail, an aquatic gastropod mollusk in the family Amnicolidae. This snail is found in France and Switzerland.

References

Bythinella
Gastropods described in 1869
Taxonomy articles created by Polbot